Popelyonki is a rural locality (a village) in Lavrovskoye Rural Settlement, Sudogodsky District, Vladimir Oblast, Russia. The population was 6 as of 2010. There are 2 streets.

Geography 
Popelyonki is located on the Sudogda River, 14 km north of Sudogda (the district's administrative centre) by road.

References 

Rural localities in Sudogodsky District